Paul Graham Frederick Mitchell, OAM (born 24 October 1970 in England)  is a Paralympic athlete with an intellectual disability from Western Australia, Australia.

Athletics career

At the 1992 Paralympic Games for Persons with Mental Handicap in Madrid, Spain, he won a silver medal in the Men's 1500 m.
Competing at the 1994 IPC Athletics World Championships, he won a gold medal in the Men's 800 m T20. At the 1998 IPC Athletics World Championships,  he competed in two events winning a silver medal in the Men's 5000m T20 and twelfth in the Men's 1500 m T20.

He won a gold medal, with a personal best, at the 2000 Sydney Games in the men's  1500m T20 event, for which he received a Medal of the Order of Australia. In 2000, he received an Australian Sports Medal. In 2000, he was a carpenter.

References

External links

Athletics Australia Results

Paralympic athletes of Australia
Athletes (track and field) at the 2000 Summer Paralympics
Paralympic gold medalists for Australia
Intellectual Disability category Paralympic competitors
Recipients of the Medal of the Order of Australia
Recipients of the Australian Sports Medal
Living people
Medalists at the 2000 Summer Paralympics
1970 births
Competitors in athletics with intellectual disability
Paralympic medalists in athletics (track and field)